Uiryeong Nam clan is a Korean clan. Their Bon-gwan is in Uiryeong County, South Gyeongsang Province. According to research from 2015, the number of people in Uiryeong Nam clan was 162729. Before he became naturalized, he was dispatched to Japan as an envoy. However, on his way back to Korea, he had a shipwreck because of a typhoon. He was granted his new surname (i.e. clan name) Nam by Gyeongdeok of Silla because he was from Runan County, China.

See also 
 Korean clan names of foreign origin

References

External links 
 

 
Korean clan names of Chinese origin
Nam clans